Bill Streever (born 1961, Kingsport, Tennessee), is a biologist and writer well known for bringing scientific topics to a popular audience.

Books

 In oceans deep: courage, innovation, and adventure beneath the waves  (2019). 
 And soon I heard a roaring wind: a natural history of moving air  (2016)
 Heat: adventures in the world's fiery places  (2013)
 Cold: Adventures in the World's Frozen Places Little, Brown, and Company (2009).

References

External links
Official Website

20th-century American non-fiction writers
American biologists
American science writers
1961 births
Writers from Tennessee
People from Kingsport, Tennessee
Living people